The Honourable Patrick J. Boyle is a judge currently serving on the Tax Court of Canada. He took office on March 30, 2007. 
Born in Victoria, B.C. Educated at the University of Ottawa (Engineering studies 1978‐80) and Osgoode Hall Law School (LL.B. 1980). Called to the Bar of Ontario in 1982. Associate and Partner, Fraser Milner Casgrain LLP (1982‐2007), two year secondment to the Federal Departments of Justice and Finance (2000‐02). At the time of his appointment, Vice‐Chair of the CBA’s National Tax Law Section, Vice‐Chair of the CBA‐CICA Joint Committee on Taxation, on the Editorial Board of CCH’s Canadian Tax Reporter. 
Prior to his appointment, taught Advanced Tax at University of Windsor Law School, served as
Special Advisor on Tax Policy to Department of Finance, member of the CRA’s GAAR Committee and Transfer Pricing Review Committee, presenter at numerous Canadian and international tax conferences including conferences sponsored by the Canadian Tax Foundation, Tax Executives Institute, Canadian Institute of Chartered Accountants, Canadian Bar Association, Advocates’ Society, American Bar Association and International Bar Association, Governor of a University College, volunteered as General Counsel to one of Canada’s largest charities. Appointed Judge of the Tax Court of Canada on March 30, 2007.

He is the father of Joshua Boyle who with Caitlan Coleman was kidnapped in Ghazni Province of Afghanistan while on a trip through Central and South Asia.  Joshua Boyle.

References

Living people
Judges of the Tax Court of Canada
Year of birth missing (living people)
21st-century Canadian judges